Tuebingosaurus (meaning "Tübingen lizard") is a genus of massopodan sauropodomorph dinosaur from the Late Triassic Trossingen Formation of Germany. The type and only species is T. maierfritzorum, originally identified as a specimen of Plateosaurus.

Discovery and naming 

The holotype, GPIT-PV-30787, also known as "GPIT IV", is a partial postcranial skeleton. It was discovered in 1922 and stored in the paleontological collection of the university of Tübingen. It was originally assigned to the species Gresslyosaurus plieningeri. Later, it was considered an exemplar of Plateosaurus, sometimes being used as reference materials for phylogenetic analyses using its name. However, it actually contains several features with more derived sauropodomorphs, which allowed it to be named as the distinct taxon Tuebingosaurus maierfritzorum in 2022. The generic name, "Tuebingosaurus", honors the city of Tübingen while the specific name, "maierfritzorum", refers to both Uwe Fritz and Wolfgang Maier; the former is an editor at the journal Vertebrate Zoology which hosted a Festschrift honoring Maier; its description was a part of this academic event.

Classification 
Although its describers only assigned it as a massopodan sauropodomorph, they also performed a phylogenetic analysis which placed it within the Sauropoda proper, possibly close to Schleitheimia.

Paleoenvironment 
The Trossingen Formation was originally interpreted as a synchronic deposit of animals, but is now considered to be a constant accumulation of mired carcasses that were deposited over hundreds of years by a river. Other specimens from this deposit include the theropod Liliensternus and several sauropodomorphs assigned to Plateosaurus and several associated names, which are in need of revision.

References 

Massopoda
Norian genera
Late Triassic dinosaurs of Europe
Triassic Germany
Fossils of Germany
Fossil taxa described in 2022